Alfred Delilia, full name Alfred Georges Marie Delilia, (16 September 1844 – 5 May 1916) was a French playwright, journalist, and chansonnier.

Biography 
A journalist under the pseudonyms Georges Davray fot L'Événement and Alfred Didier for Le Voltaire, publication director of the L'Écho de la Légion d'honneur, he was dramaturge of the Théâtre Antoine. From 1897, his plays were presented on the most important Parisian stages of the end of the 19th-century and the beginning of the 20th including the Théâtre des Bouffes-Parisiens, Théâtre Déjazet, and the Théâtre des Délassements-Comiques.

Works 

 On nous écrit de Marseille, vaudeville in 1 act, 1867
 Au Grand-Cerf, vaudeville in 3 acts, with Charles Le Senne, 1869
 La Bonne à Venture, vaudeville in 1 act, with Le Senne, 1872
 Les Mémoires d'un flageolet, vaudeville in 3 acts, with Le Senne, 1872
 Le Théâtre Scribe, à-propos in verses, with Le Senne, 1874
 Allons bébé !, song, music by Robert Planquette, 1879
 Le Bout de l'an de l'amour !, song, music by Planquette, 1883
 Je ne suis pas vantard, monologue, 1883
 L'Inventeur, monologue, 1885
 Le Terrible Bonnivet, comédie-vaudeville in 1 act, with Émile Seurat, 1885
 Les Chastes, couplets, with Paul Ferrier, music by Lucien Delormel, 1893
 Olympia, ballet in 2 acts, music by Antoine Banès, 1893
 La Revue sans gêne, revue in 3 acts, 9 tableaux, with Henri Blondeau and Hector Monréal, 1894
 Tout Paris à l'Olympia, revue in 2 acts and 3 tableaux, with Ferrier, 1897
 Qui va à la chasse, operetta in 1 act, with Eugène Héros, music by Émile Duhem, 1898
 La Czarda, 1900
 Le Monsieur de chez Maxim, with Ernest Henri Demanne, 1900
 Séduction !, valse chantée, music by Jane Vieu, 1902
 La Valse des rousses, poem, music by Vieu, 1904
 La Femme de César, comedy in 1 act, with Serge Basset, 1905
 Trottinette !, valse chantée, with Marguerite Ugalde, 1907

Bibliography 
 Georges d'Heylli, Dictionnaire des pseudonymes, 1869, (p. 101)
 Jules Martin, Nos auteurs et compositeurs dramatiques, 1897, (p. 160)
 Pierre Larousse, Nouveau Larousse illustré, supplément, 1906, (p. 176) 

19th-century French dramatists and playwrights
20th-century French dramatists and playwrights
19th-century French journalists
French male journalists
20th-century French journalists
French chansonniers
Writers from Paris
1844 births
1916 deaths
19th-century French male writers
20th-century French male writers